Arpa Chai (also Romanized as Ārpā Chā’ī and Ārpā Chāy) is a village in Sanjabad-e Shomali Rural District, in the Central District of Kowsar County, Ardabil Province, Iran. At the 2006 census, its population was 221, in 34 families.

References 

Tageo

Towns and villages in Kowsar County